Giacomo Carboni (29 April 1889 – 2 December 1973) was an Italian general who was the commander of Corpo d'armata motocorazzato deployed around Rome in the early days of September 1943.

Life and career 

Born in Reggio Emilia he joined the Modena Military Academy where he was commissioned Sottotenente. Then he fought in the Libyan war. During World War I he was an officer of the Alpini. In 1936–37 he was commander of the 81st infantry regiment during the Second Italo-Abyssinian War, in 1939 he was Vice Commander of Cacciatori delle Alpi division. From September 1939 to June 1940 he was the chief of SIM. As chief of the Italian military secret service he wrote a series of reports to Mussolini wherein the Italian preparation to the war was described as inadequate. Carboni was dismissed from his post at SIM and was made commander of the Modena Military Academy.

From December 1941 until November 1942, he was commander of the 20 Infantry Division Friuli and in the first half of 1943, he led the VII Army Corps during the Italian occupation of Corsica.

Role in 1943

In the eve of the 25 July coup General Ambrosio named Carboni as head of the Corpo d'armata motocorazzato in charge of the defense of Rome against the Germans and he cooperated in the overthrow of Mussolini. In the days between 2 July and 8 September he was also named head of the SIM again and he ordered the arrest of many fascists loyal to Mussolini.

In the night of 7 September he hosted US general Maxwell D. Taylor and declared to the US counterpart his impossibility to defend Rome against the Germans due to the weakness of Italian forces. Despite the fact that the divisions in his command were the most modern and largely superior in numbers in the night of 8 September he did not attack the German forces and in the morning of the 9 September Carboni left his post as commander of the army corps and tried to reach the group around King Victor Emmanuel III and Pietro Badoglio. In the late hours of the 9 September he returned to Rome but his command was ineffective.

After the liberation of Rome he was under investigation for his role in the failed defence of Rome but was acquitted.

References

1889 births
1973 deaths
People from Reggio Emilia
Italian generals
Italian military personnel of World War I
Italian military personnel of World War II